Frederick Cronyn Betts (July 4, 1896May 7, 1938) was a Canadian politician and solicitor. He was elected to the House of Commons of Canada in 1935 as a Member of the Conservative Party to represent the riding of London. He died in office on May 7, 1938. Prior to his federal political experience, he was a councillor on the London City Council between 1928 and 1929. During World War I, he served overseas with the 12th Battery, Canadian Field Artillery in France.

External links
 

1896 births
1938 deaths
Lawyers in Ontario
Conservative Party of Canada (1867–1942) MPs
Members of the House of Commons of Canada from Ontario
London, Ontario city councillors
Canadian Army personnel